Trait may refer to:

 Phenotypic trait in biology, which involve genes and characteristics of organisms
 Genotypic trait, sometimes but not always presenting as a phenotypic trait
 Trait (computer programming), a model for structuring object-oriented programs (a template class in the C++ programming language)
 Personality, traits that predict an individual's behavior.
 Trait theory in psychology

Entertainment 
 Trait (album), the first and only EP by the industrial rock/metal band Pailhead
 Traits (Joe Morris album)
 Trait (role-playing games), a type of role-playing statistic